Since Pearl Harbor is a 1943 short documentary film commissioned by the United States Government during World War II. It is a "report to the American People" regarding the wartime activities of the American Red Cross since the Attack on Pearl Harbor.

Archive
The Academy Film Archive preserved Since Pearl Harbor in 2009. The film is part of the Academy War Film Collection, one of the largest collections of World War II era short films held outside government archives.

References

External links

 

1943 films
American World War II propaganda shorts
American short documentary films
American black-and-white films
1940s short documentary films
Black-and-white documentary films
1940s English-language films
1940s American films